Jon Yarbrough (born 1956/1957) is an American billionaire, the founder of Video Gaming Technologies.

Early life
Jon Yarbrough has a bachelor's degree from Tennessee Technological University. His first entrepreneurial experience was selling with Southwestern Advantage. An aficionado of foosball, he then purchased a foosball table and struck a deal with a bar in Cookeville, Tennessee (where Tennessee Tech is located): if they would store the table for him, he would split the proceeds earned from games played by the bar's clients.

Career
In 1991, Yarbrough founded Video Gaming Technologies. In October 2014, he sold it to the Australian company Aristocrat Leisure for $1.28 billion.

As of September 2015, he had a net worth of US$1.7 billion. In 2020, he ranked No. 327 on the Forbes 400 list of America's richest people.

Personal life
Yarbrough is married with two children and lives in Franklin, Tennessee.

References

Living people
People from Franklin, Tennessee
Tennessee Technological University alumni
American chief executives
American chairpersons of corporations
American billionaires
1950s births